The Santa Clauses is an American Christmas comedy television series created by Jack Burditt for Disney+ and based on The Santa Clause film series.  It serves as a sequel to The Santa Clause 3: The Escape Clause (2006) and features Tim Allen, Elizabeth Mitchell, Eric Lloyd, and David Krumholtz reprising their roles from the film series. Jack Burditt serves as showrunner and executive producer.

It premiered on November 16, 2022. The Santa Clauses was renewed for a second season in December 2022.

Premise

Cast and characters

Main
 Tim Allen as Scott Calvin / Santa Claus: A former successful businessman, who became Santa Claus in 1994 and chose to remain in the role out of the goodness of his heart. After almost 30 years in his role, Calvin  believes that he is losing his magical abilities due to aging and chooses to retire after choosing a successor. He is revealed to be the first human to take up the mantle of Santa Claus after the army of previous Santa Clauses determined that the world needed someone who would be familiar with the development of technology and given the nature of Santa Claus that Calvin had naturally within; all of his traits being what the world needs. Liam Seja portrays Calvin as a child, during a flashback sequence.
 Elizabeth Mitchell as Carol Calvin / Mrs. Claus: Calvin's wife, who he married during The Santa Clause 2. Carol has grown inquisitive as to her greater purpose as Santa's wife over the years, and is receptive to his decision to retire. Finding success once again in her role as a school principal when they move out of the North Pole, she begins to believe that Calvin's decision was best for the entire family.
 Austin Kane as Buddy "Cal" Calvin-Claus: Scott's youngest son, Carol's only son, Sandra's brother, and Charlie's paternal half brother. Cal at first is excited to experience life in his own way, believing that he did not hold the same skills that his father seems to have. Over the course of the series, its revealed that he possesses magical abilities due to being born in the North Pole and the spirit of Christmas. The character first appeared in The Santa Clause 3: The Escape Clause, where he was named Buddy after his maternal grandfather.
 Elizabeth Allen-Dick as Sandra Calvin-Claus: Scott and Carol's daughter and youngest child; Buddy's sister and Charlie's paternal half-sister. Sandra enjoys living in at the North Pole, and is hesitant to move away when her father decides to retire. At the confusion of her parents, she often develops close friendships with animals. Over the course of the series, it's revealed that she has magical abilities that she inherited from Santa Claus and the spirit of Christmas.
 Matilda Lawler as Betty: Chief of Staff at the North Pole, and Noel's wife.
 Devin Bright as Noel: The current right-hand elf at the North Pole, Betty's husband, and one of Santa's best friends.
 Rupali Redd as Grace Choksi: Simon's kind-hearted daughter, who believes in the spirit of Christmas. Grace is excited to live at the North Pole, and experience the joys of Christmas every day. Her mother expressed desires for the feelings of Christmas every day, prior to passing from a major illness.
 Kal Penn as Simon Choksi / Santa Claus: The man that Scott Calvin chooses to be his successor as Santa Claus at the North Pole. Prior to his new role, Choski is a game inventor, product developer, and single father with aspirations to become the equivalent of "the next Jeff Bezos" in the technology world. When he is appointed as the next Santa Claus, he views the efficiency at the North Pole as an opportunity to realize his unsuccessful business aspirations. Leading in his new role forcefully, Simon determines that every day will be Christmas, providing the world with instant gratification through a combination of his business technology and the North Pole's magic. Over the course of the series, he becomes disillusioned and an antagonist to the spirit of Christmas. As the magic at the North Pole begins to fade, Choksi finds himself at odds with Calvin who returns to reclaim his role as Santa Claus.
 Gabriel Iglesias as Kris Kringle (season 2)

Recurring

 Isabella Bennett as Edie: An elf at the North Pole who regularly reviews the List with Santa, to ensure that good children receive what they want on Christmas day. Edie is an advocate for the naughty children as well.
 Sasha Knight as Crouton: An elf at the North Pole who assists Santa.
Izaac Wang as Hugo: An elf at the North Pole who helps run the machinery that monitors Santa Claus while he makes his deliveries on Christmas Eve.
 Laura San Giacomo as La Befana: The good-natured Italian folkloric holiday figure, known as the Christmas witch, who lives in the Wobbly Woods.
 Liam Kyle as Gary, an elf in charge of the E.L.F.S. (Effective Liberating Flight Squad).
 Ruby Jay as Riley: Cal Calvin's supportive first girlfriend. The pair first meet when the Calvin family moves to Chicago, and though Cal is an outsider at school, Riley immediately takes a liking to him.

Guest stars
 Eric Lloyd as Charlie Calvin: Scott's oldest son from his previous marriage, and Carol's step-son. Charlie is Buddy and Sandra's paternal half-brother, and though he expressed interest in following in his father's footsteps as a child, he now states that his current job and young family prevent him from being able to be the successor when his father chooses to retire.
 Peyton Manning as himself, a potential candidate for a replacement Santa. 
 David Krumholtz as Bernard: The former right-hand elf to Calvin as Santa, who's revealed to have served in the role for thousands of years with the previous figures who held the mantle of Santa Claus, before briefly retiring to marry Vanessa Redgrave.
 Mitch Poulos as Saint Nicholas of Myra: The historical figure who served as inspiration for the legend of Santa Claus. Through his benevolent good acts of kindness and example in the spirit of giving, the spirit of Christmas created magic that resulted in the creation of ethereal figures including the role of Santa, elves, and flying reindeer.
 Mauricio Mendoza as Papa Noel / Santa Claus: One of the ancient successors to St. Nicholas, a Frenchman who carried the mantle for a time and completed his role as Santa Claus.
 Dirk Rogers as Krampus: The ancient folklore anthropomorphic horned being, who served during the Dark Ages as the successor to St. Nicholas; known for his role in scaring children into behaving for their parents. In the series Krampus is shown to be stealing toys from children on the naughty list.
 Jim O'Heir as Santa Claus XVII: Calvin's predecessor and the seventeenth successor to Saint Nicholas, referred to amongst the various previous holders of the Santa Claus mantle as number "17". This man acted in the role of Santa for decades, from the Great Depression to the night that Scott Calvin became Santa Claus. He chose Scott after interacting with him as a child one night on Christmas Eve. Previously thought to have randomly passed away after falling off of Scott's roof in the '90s, it is revealed that he retired to the afterlife after choosing his successor correctly. O'Heir takes over the role from Steve Lucescu, who appeared in The Santa Clause and The Santa Clause 3: The Escape Clause.
 Casey Wilson as Sara: Now fully grown, she was once the little girl Scott first encountered as Santa in the first film. Wilson replaces Melissa King, from The Santa Clause.

Episodes

Production

Development 
In January 2022, it was announced that a limited series that would serve as a legacy-sequel to The Santa Clause films was in development, with Tim Allen reprising his role in addition to serving as executive producer. Initially given the working title of "The Clauses", the project was conceptualized with intent for a streaming release exclusive to Disney+. Jack Burditt serves as showrunner and executive producer, while Jason Winer is a director in addition to serving as an executive producer.

According to Allen, “It originally had a lot of otherworldly characters, and ghosts, and goblins. I said no, this is Christ-mas. Its Christ-mas. It literally is a religious holiday. We don’t have to blow trumpets, but I do want you to acknowledge it. That’s what this is about. If you want to get into Santa Claus, you’re gonna have to go back to history, and it’s all about religion.” On December 14, 2022, The Santa Clauses was renewed for a second season, with Tim Allen and Elizabeth Mitchell set to return.

Casting
Tim Allen and Elizabeth Mitchell were announced to be reprising their roles as Scott Calvin / Santa Claus and Carol Calvin / Mrs. Claus, respectively. In addition, Kal Penn joined the cast as a character named Simon Choski. Elizabeth Allen-Dick, Tim Allen's real life daughter, had been cast in her acting debut as Scott's daughter. Austin Kane, Rupali Redd and Devin Bright also joined the cast. Matilda Lawler joined the cast as a series regular. In late July 2022, it was confirmed that David Krumholtz would be reprising his role as Bernard, while the following month, Laura San Giacomo was announced to be portraying the Christmas Witch. On February 24, 2023, Eric Stonestreet joined the cast in undisclosed capacity while Marta Kessler was cast to guest star for the second season. Three days later, Gabriel Iglesias was cast as a series regular for the second season.

Filming 
The series began filming in March 2022 in Los Angeles, with JP Wakayama serving as the cinematographer. Filming wrapped in June 2022. Production for the second season began in February 2023.

Music 
In November 2022, it was revealed that Ariel Rechtshaid would compose the score for the series.

Release
The Santa Clauses was released on November 16, 2022 on Disney+, with its first two episodes available immediately.

The first 2 episodes made its linear premiere on Freeform on December 16, 2022 followed by airings on FX on December 17, 2022, ABC on December 24, 2022 and on Disney Channel on December 25, 2022.

Reception

Audience viewership 
According to the streaming aggregator JustWatch, The Santa Clauses was the 10th most streamed television series across all platforms in the United States, during the week of November 14, 2022 to November 20, 2022. According to Whip Media's TV Time, The Santa Clauses was the 5th most streamed television series across all platforms in the United States, during the week of December 11, 2022, and the 4th during the week of December 18, 2022.

Critical response 
 Metacritic, which uses a weighted average, assigned a score of 55 out of 100 based on six critics, indicating "mixed or average reviews".

See also
 List of Christmas films
 Santa Claus in film

Notes

References

External links 
 
 

2020s American comedy television series
2022 American television series debuts
American comedy web series
American sequel television series
Christmas television series
Disney+ original programming
English-language television shows
Live action television shows based on films
Santa Claus in television
Television series by 20th Century Fox Television
Television shows filmed in Los Angeles
The Santa Clause (franchise)